The Fountainhead is a 1943 novel by Ayn Rand.

Fountainhead may also refer to:

Music
The Fountainhead (band), an Irish rock band
Fountainhead (album), a 1989 album by Andy LaVerne
"Slight Return/The Fountainhead", a 1995 single by the Bluetones
"Fountainhead (Unbound)", a song by Hands Like Houses from Unimagine
"Fountainhead", a song by Echolyn from Echolyn

Places
Fountainhead School, a school in Surat, India
Fountainhead (Jackson, Mississippi), a house designed by Frank Lloyd Wright
Fountainhead-Orchard Hills, Maryland, a census-designated place
Lake Eufaula State Park or Fountainhead State Park, a park in McIntosh County, Oklahoma
Fountainhead Regional Park, a park in Fairfax County, Virginia
Fountainhead Village, a hamlet in Calderdale, West Yorkshire, UK

Other uses
The Fountainhead (film), a 1949 movie based on Rand's novel
The Fountainhead (play), a 2014 play based on Rand's novel
Fountainhead (yacht), a 2011 motor yacht
Fountainhead Entertainment, a video game production company founded by Katherine Anna Kang

See also 
Fountain (disambiguation)
Hydraulic head
River source